Chittering is a town and rural district approximately 70 km NNE of Perth, Western Australia. It is located along the Brockman River within the Shire of Chittering. It lies between the towns of Gingin and Toodyay, in the Wheatbelt region.

The area was first explored by George Fletcher Moore in 1836 and has been known by that name since Moore recorded it on his maps. The name is Aboriginal in origin and is thought to mean place of the willie wagtails.

References

Towns in Western Australia